Don Mentony Band is a blues, boogie and rock and roll group from Slovenia.

Don Mentony Band became recognised in the late 1980s with the remake of the song "Tulsa Time" (in Slovenian Dobra mrha). The original team were guitarist Janez Hostnik, bass guitarist Frenk Brajer, drummer Robert Fritsch, singer Jani Kovačič and animator Miha Mentony. Later Janez Zmazek - Žan joined as guitarist. Zmazek soon took over the lead in the band and in the early 1992 (after three released albums) the group was left by bass guitarist and singer. Zmazek didn't want to seek another singer, so he decided to sing by himself. The bass player was in March 1992 replaced by Aleksander Cepuš (Alex Bass). In April 1992, the renewed band started to concert. They played two concerts: 20 years of Val 202 in Križanke (MC ZKP RTV 1992) and benefit concert for Bosnia and Herzegovina in Hala Tivoli. They recorded the album Ko noč zamenja dan and album for the singer Janko Ropret. They also performed at a festival Melodije morja in sonca in Portorose and as main guests on a pop workshop 1992. At the end of 1992, the bass guitarist was replaced by Ana Korenini, who played for three years. In that period, many other guitarists were replaced who tried to substitute Janez Hostnik, who left the band in 1993; first came guitarist Bruno, then for the same period Matej Mršnik and at the end Zvone Kukec.

After a period of inactivity, the frontman again gathered a group of musicians in 2010 and resumed performing under this name. They published a best-of live album and played several concerts since then.

Discography 
 Don Menthony Blues Band (without Janez Zmazek - Žan) (MC ZKP RTV 1988)
 Dobra mrha (MC and CD, ZKP RTV 1989)
 Rad bi bil baraba (MC and CD, ZKP RTV 1990)
 Nezaposlenim vstop prepovedan (MC and CD, ZKP RTV 1991)
 Ko noč zamenja dan (MC and CD, ZKP RTV 1992)
 Zmikavti (MC and CD, ZKP RTV, 1993)
 Hopla konopla (CD, ZKP 1994)
 Prva Petletka (89-94) (1996) (ZKP RTV Slovenija)
 Lenoba (CD 1995)
 Na drugi strani (CD 1997)
 Dobr se mi dogaja (CD, NIKA Records 2000)
 The Best of - LIVE (2010) (ZKP RTV Slovenija)
 Don Mentony Band + Janko Ropret: Vrni se (MC, Didakta 1992)
 Don Mentony Band + Janko Ropret: Jesen (CD, ZKP RTV, 1995)
 20 let Vala 202 (medley Dobra mrha + Rekla je ne) (MC ZKP RTV, 1992)

References

External links 
 

Slovenian rock music groups
Yugoslav rock music groups
Slovenian musical groups
Musical groups from Ljubljana